BankIslami Pakistan LTD. is a Pakistani Islamic bank based in Karachi, Pakistan. It has 340 branches in 114 cities in Pakistan. It is the first Islamic commercial bank to receive the Islamic banking license under the Islamic banking policy of 2003 from the State Bank of Pakistan on March 31, 2005. The bank started its operations on 7 April 2006 and offers shariah-compliant retail banking, investment banking, consumer banking, and trade finance products. The bank intends to focus on wealth management as the core area of business and plans to soon launch proprietary products and integrated financial planning services. The bank has a nationwide presence. Its branch network consists of 343 branches and sub-branches spread over 125 cities in Pakistan. With the amalgamation of KASB on May 7, 2015, all 104 branches of KASB have become part of BankIslami’s branch network. BankIslami is now the 11th largest banking network in the country with 317 branches in 93 cities nationwide. The idea of BankIslami was conceptualized by Jahangir Siddiqui & Company Limited and Randeree family in late 2003. Mr. Hasan A. Bilgram I. was appointed as adviser to the sponsors on 16th March 2004 to formalize the idea. He presented the concept paper of BankIslami to sponsors on 24 March 2004. A detailed business plan was then prepared and a formal application was submitted to the State Bank of Pakistan on 26 May 2004. On the 26th of September 2005, Dubai Bank joined the sponsors and became one of the founding shareholders of BankIslami by investing 18.75% in the total capital.

Accreditation by the State Bank of Pakistan
The State Bank of Pakistan issued a No Objection Certificate on 19 August 2004, and BankIslami Pakistan Limited, the second full-fledged Islamic commercial bank in Pakistan, was incorporated on 18 October 2004 in Pakistan.

BankIslami Pakistan Limited was the first bank to receive an Islamic banking license under the Islamic banking policy of 2003 on 31 March 2005. The bank envisioned focusing primarily on wealth management as the core area of business in addition to sharia-compliant retail banking products, Proprietary and Third-party products, and Integrated financial planning services.

Initial public offering of BankIslami
BankIslami Pakistan Limited made a public offering of Rs. 400 million, at par, from 6 to 8 March 2006. This was the first primary issue by a bank in over a decade in Pakistan. The initial public offering (IPO) of BankIslami received overwhelming response from the general public as the applications received were nine times higher than offered, fetching nearly Rs. 3.5 billion, against the demand of Rs. 400 million.

Inauguration and network expansion
The State Bank of Pakistan declared BankIslami Pakistan Limited as a Scheduled Bank with effect from 17 March 2006. BankIslami started its banking operations on 7 April 2006 with its first branch in SITE, Karachi. By the end of 2006, the bank had 10 branches, nine in Karachi and one in Quetta. The bank further concentrated on building a nationwide network and by the end of 2007, its branch network grew to 36 branches in 23 cities. In 2008, the bank opened 66 new branches nationwide which expanded its network to 102 branches in 49 cities. By the end of 2013, the bank has achieved the target of 201 branches in 77 cities nationwide. Currently, BankIslami is operating 213 branches in 80 cities in Pakistan. With the amalgamation of KASB, on 7 May 2015, all 104 branches of KASB have become part of BankIslami’s branch network. BankIslami is now the 11th largest banking network in the country with 317 branches in 93 cities nationwide.

Sponsors
BankIslami is the joint venture project of three groups namely JS Group, Randeree Group, and Emirates NBD. The bank is also publicly traded on the Pakistan Stock Exchange (PSX).

Randeree family
Mr. Ahmed Goolam Mahomed Randeree and Mr. Shabbir Ahmed Randeree are the sponsors of BankIslami in their personal capacity.

The history of the modern Randeree family can be traced back to Jersey (in the Channel Islands) in 1975. After three decades of trading, today the family concern has its family investment office based out of the DIFC (Dubai International Financial Centre) with its operations extending to London, New York, and Dubai.

The Randeree family's core business activities are concentrated in the real estate and banking sectors. The real estate division of the Randeree family concentrates on enhancing and delivering long-term gains for the family concern and its partners internationally. The family concern has built its track-record primarily in the UK and US, then spread to the Middle East and a selected number of Far East and African destinations.

As of June 2007, the total value of properties owned and/or managed by the Randeree family was in excess of US $3.0 billion.

The Randeree family's interests in the banking sector consist of various niche holdings internationally, including a stake in Dallah Albaraka Bank Limited in South Africa which was formed in 1989.

More recently, the family concern played a role with QIIB (Qatar International Islamic Bank) in the formation of the Islamic Bank of Britain PLC (IBB) and retains its shareholding in the bank. It also remains a founding shareholder in the European Islamic Investment Bank PLC (EIIB), which raised approximately 200 million pound, pre and post-listing on the LSE.

In 2007, the family concern were founding investors in the Islamic Bank of Asia in Singapore, with DBS Development Bank of Singapore as the principal promoter.

Dubai Bank PJSC
Dubai Bank PJSC is an Islamic bank based in Dubai, United Arab Emirates (U.A.E). It commenced operations in September 2002 as a conventional bank. However, on 1 January 2007, it converted into sharia-compliant financial institution with a focus on the UAE’s Islamic banking sector.

The bank offers a full range of products and services through its corporate and consumer banking divisions. These include transaction and deposit accounts, financing, trade finance, and wealth management services as well as a host of other unique banking services.

Dubai Bank was part of the Dubai Group, a Dubai Holdings company, with shareholding of Emaar Properties as well. However, in May 2011, the Government of Dubai took over the bank, and in October 2011 it was acquired by Emirates NBD.

Jahangir Siddiqui & Co. Ltd
Jahangir Siddiqui & Co. Ltd. (JSCL) is the holding company for one of the largest and most diversified financial services groups in Pakistan, involved in investment banking, broker-dealer operations, proprietary trading, insurance, banking and asset management. The company was established in 1991 and was the first Pakistani financial services company to boast a Wall Street pedigree due to its previous joint venture with Bear Stearns. It is also the only securities company to be a primary dealer for government securities in Pakistan, and is one of the largest bond trading firms in Pakistan. JSCL is a listed company on the Pakistan Stock Exchange.

JSCL subsidiaries include JS Global Capital Ltd, JS Bank, and JS-Investment Ltd. JSCL also has holdings in the sugar, sugar derivatives, specialty textile, specialty steels and insurance sectors through significant minority holding in leading companies in these sectors. These strategic investments and associated companies include, EFU General Insurance, EFU Life Assurance, Allianz EFU Health Insurance, Azgard Nine, and Al-Abbas Sugar Mills amongst others.

Amalgamation with KASB Bank Limited
State Bank of Pakistan has proposed the amalgamation of KASB Bank Limited (KASB) into BankIslami Pakistan Limited at a token price of Rs 1,000. Sources told Business Recorder that SBP has initiated the amalgamation process of KASB Bank into BIPL pursuant to the powers conferred on them under section 47 of the Banking Companies Ordinance 1962, as six months moratorium imposed on KASB Bank is being completed next month and before that, the regulator is required to complete its restructuring in order to protect the investors' interest.

Initially, some four banks including JS Bank, Askari Bank, BankIslami and Sindh Bank were intending to acquire KASB Bank operations and approached SBP to get NoC for due diligence of KASB for proposed acquisition. However, now SBP has selected BankIslami for amalgamation of KASB Bank.

KASB Bank has been facing a severe capital shortfall in terms of both minimum capital requirement (MCR) and capital adequacy ratio (CAR) since 2009. As of 30 September 2014, the bank's MCR (free of losses) was in the amount of Rs 0.958 billion with a CAR of negative 4.63 percent against the required levels of Rs 10 billion and 10 percent, respectively.

On 7 May 2015, KASB Bank merged with BankIslami Pakistan Limited with its branch network of 104 which made BankIslami a bank of 317 branches in 93 cities.

Muskun Home Financing 
Interwood signed an MOU with BankIslami for providing its customers with an option of paying in installments its products under Home Purchase/Renovation category through Muskun Home Financing.

See also

Economy of the OIC

References

External links

2006 establishments in Pakistan
Banks established in 2006
Islamic banks of Pakistan
Companies based in Karachi
Companies listed on the Pakistan Stock Exchange
Pakistani subsidiaries of foreign companies